Barbara Ann Whitlock (born 1967) is a botanist, who earned a Ph.D. from Harvard University, with her dissertation Systematics and evolution of chocolate and its relatives (Sterculiaceae or Malvaceae s.l.) , an interest which continues.

She has been working in the Department of Biology, University of Miami from at least 2015, where she works on tropical (plant) biology, and ecology and evolutionary biology.

Much of her work centres on Malvaceae and related phylogeny.

She has published 39 names, including Androcalva fraseri, and Commersonia borealis. (See also Taxa named by Barbara Ann Whitlock.)

The standard author abbreviation Whitlock is used to indicate this person as the author when citing a botanical name.

References 

1967 births
Living people
American botanists
University of Miami faculty
University of Wisconsin–Madison alumni
University of Missouri alumni
Harvard University alumni